The year 2009 is the 17th year in the history of the Ultimate Fighting Championship (UFC), a mixed martial arts promotion based in the United States. In 2009 the UFC held 20 events beginning with, UFC 93: Franklin vs. Henderson.

Title fights

The Ultimate Fighter

Debut UFC fighters

The following fighters fought their first UFC fight in 2009:

Aaron Simpson
Alexander Gustafsson
Alexandre Barros
Andre Winner
Antônio Rogério Nogueira
Ben Rothwell
Brendan Schaub
Brian Cobb
Brian Foster
Brian Stann
Cameron Dollar
Carlos Condit
Chase Gormley
Chris Tuchscherer
DaMarques Johnson
Dan Cramer
Danillo Villefort
Darrill Schoonover
Denis Kang
Denis Stojnic
Derek Downey
Drew McFedries
Edgar Garcia
Evan Dunham
Fabricio Camões
Frank Lester

Igor Pokrajac
Ivan Serati
Jacob Volkmann
Jake Ellenberger
Jake Rosholt
James McSweeney
James Wilks
Jared Hamman
Jay Silva
Jesse Lennox
Jesse Sanders
Joe Brammer
John Hathaway
John Howard
Johny Hendricks
Jon Madsen
Justin Wren
Kimbo Slice
Lucio Linhares
Marcus Jones
Mark Muñoz
Matt Mitrione
Matt Veach
Mike Ciesnolevicz
Mike Pierce
Mike Pyle

Mike Russow
Neil Grove
Nick Catone
Nick Osipczak
Nik Lentz
Nissen Osterneck
Paul Daley
Paulo Thiago
Peter Sobotta
Rafaello Oliveira
Ricardo Funch
Rick Story
Rodney Wallace
Ross Pearson
Roy Nelson
Ryan Madigan
Stefan Struve
Steve Lopez
Steve Steinbeiss
Tim Hague
Tim McKenzie
T. J. Grant
Todd Duffee
Tom Egan
Xavier Foupa-Pokam
Yoshihiro Akiyama

Events list

See also
 UFC
 List of UFC champions
 List of UFC events

References

Ultimate Fighting Championship by year
2009 in mixed martial arts